John C. Yallop (born 24 October 1949) is a retired British rower who competed in the 1976 Summer Olympics.

Rowing career
Yallop won the coxless pairs title rowing for the Thames Tradesmen's and Leander composite, with Lenny Robertson, at the 1973 National Rowing Championships. He participated in the 1974 World Rowing Championships in Lucerne, competing in the eights event in which Great Britain won a silver medal.

In 1976 he was a crew member of the British boat which won the silver medal in the eights event at the 1976 Olympic Games.

Personal life
He was educated at Bedford Modern School.

References

External links
 

1949 births
People educated at Bedford Modern School
Living people
British male rowers
Olympic rowers of Great Britain
Rowers at the 1976 Summer Olympics
Olympic silver medallists for Great Britain
Olympic medalists in rowing
World Rowing Championships medalists for Great Britain
Medalists at the 1976 Summer Olympics